Astragalus crotalariae is a species of milkvetch in the family Fabaceae.

References

chiwensis
Taxa named by Alexander von Bunge